This is a partial list of works by English stained glass artist, Karl Parsons (1884–1934), for churches and cathedrals.

In writing about his craft Parsons wrote that to be worthy of it the stained glass artist had to have "a vocation for his job. He must be an artist who loves glass, the look and the feel and the mystery of it. But, above all, he must be an artist with knowledge of, and respect for, the traditions of his craft".  Parsons described stained glass as "the most perfect art form known".

Works
The partial list of Parson's works is sorted by date.

Gallery

See also
 Christopher Whall
 List of works by Christopher Whall
 Christopher Whall in Gloucester Cathedral
Other followers of Christopher Whall
 The works of Veronica Whall
 Works of Arnold Wathen Robinson
 List of works by Margaret Chilton
 List of works by Marjorie Kemp
 Works of Caroline Townshend

References

External links
 Flickr: examples of Parsons’ windows

British stained glass artists and manufacturers